Gamasellus lativentralis is a species of mite in the family Ologamasidae.

References

lativentralis
Articles created by Qbugbot
Animals described in 1983